The Team Speedway Junior European Championship is an annual motorcycle speedway event for junior riders. The event is organised by the European Motorcycle Union (UEM) from 2008 to 2012. From 2013 to 2020, it was organised by Fédération Internationale de Motocyclisme.

In 2021, the competition age limit increased to under 23 years of age.

The first edition of the competition was in 2008 in Rawicz, Poland, which was won by the Swedish team. The next two editions were won by Poland team, and they have since gone on to claim a total of 12 titles.

Age Limits 
From 2008 to 2011 the age limit was under 19.
From 2012 to 2020 the age limit was under 21.
From 2021 to 2022 the age limit was under 23.

Previous winners

Classification

References

 
Team 21